SM U-93 was one of the 329 submarines serving in the Imperial German Navy in World War I. 
U-93 was engaged in the naval warfare and took part in the First Battle of the Atlantic.

Design
German Type U 93 submarines were preceded by the shorter Type U 87 submarines. U-93 had a displacement of  when at the surface and  while submerged. The submarine was powered by two  engines for use while surfaced, and two  engines for use while submerged. She had two propeller shafts.

U-93 was fitted with six  torpedo tubes (four at the bow and two at the stern), twelve to sixteen torpedoes, and one  SK L/30 deck gun. She had a complement of thirty-six (thirty-two crew members and four officers).

Operational history

After February 1917 she was commanded by the late author of books (e.g. U boat 202. The war diary of a German submarine, 1919) and experienced submarine commander Edgar von Spiegel von und zu Peckelsheim

HMS Prize was damaged by shellfire. After the 'panic party' had taken to the boats and the ship appeared to be sinking, the U-boat approached to within  of her port quarter, whereupon the White Ensign was hoisted and the Prize opened fire.

Within a few minutes the submarine was on fire and her bows rose in the air, whilst the Prize was further damaged. The U-boat disappeared from sight, and was believed to have been sunk by the crew of the Prize and by several of the German crew (including her captain) who had been blown or jumped into the sea.

Neither of the crippled ships had sunk, with the Prize being towed in flames back to Kinsale, while the U-93 struggled back to the Sylt nine days later after a dramatic escape effort through the British mine and destroyer barrages off Dover.

U 93 after repairs operated in the English channel. She was lost to unknown cause off Hardelot, France in January 1918. The wreck was located by divers in 2003.

Summary of raiding history

References

Notes

Citations

Bibliography

World War I submarines of Germany
German Type U 93 submarines
Ships built in Kiel
1916 ships
U-boats commissioned in 1917
Maritime incidents in 1918
U-boats sunk in 1918
Missing U-boats of World War I